HMS Berbice was a schooner that the Royal Navy purchased in the West Indies in 1780, and that for a time served as a tender to , the flagship of Sir Richard Hughes in the Leeward Islands Station. She was commissioned in July 1781. Between 1782 and 1783 Lieutenant Thomas Boulden Thompson commanded her. On 23 February 1782 she was at English Harbour, almost ready, but without any crew.

Between 1784 and autumn 1786, when he returned to England in Adamant, Berbices commander was Mr. James Bremer. 

Berbice was condemned at Antigua on 12 September 1788.

Berbice apparently later became .

The National Maritime Museum, Greenwich has a one-page drawing labeled "A DRAWING OF HIS MAJESTY'S ARM'D SCHOONER BERBICE, THE 5TH AUG 1789" that comprises a sheer plan, body lines, deck plan, lines, and a view of her stern. These drawings represent the earliest draught of what became known as the Baltimore Clipper.

Citations and references
Citations

References
 
 

1780s ships
Schooners of the Royal Navy